Costa Khaiseb (born November 23, 1980 in Windhoek) is a Namibian football striker and part of the Namibia national football team. 
He played for Namibian club Ramblers from 2002–2006, for Black Leopards in 06-07 season and came back to Ramblers where he played until the end of a season 2009-2010. He was a part of the Namibian squad in qualifiers for World cup 2010.

References

Namibia international footballers
Namibian expatriate footballers
Living people
1980 births
Footballers from Windhoek
Expatriate footballers in Angola
Expatriate soccer players in South Africa
Namibian expatriate sportspeople in Angola
Namibian expatriate sportspeople in South Africa
F.C. Civics Windhoek players
Ramblers F.C. players
Black Leopards F.C. players
Atlético Sport Aviação players
F.C. AK players
Association football forwards
Namibia Premier League players
Namibian men's footballers